Steven Watkins or Steve Watkins or Stephen Watkins may refer to

Steve Watkins (baseball) (Stephen Douglas Watkins, born 1978), American baseball pitcher
Steve Watkins (Steven Charles Watkins Jr., born 1976), American politician
Stephen Watkins (Stephen George Watkins , born 1959), English cricketer